Shelee Brim (born September 10, 1962) is an American politician who served in the Kansas House of Representatives from the 39th district in Johnson County, Kansas from 2017 to 2019. She is a retired teacher.

2017-2018 Kansas House of Representatives Committee Assignments
Veterans and Military
Transportation
Higher Education Budget

References

1962 births
Living people
Republican Party members of the Kansas House of Representatives
Place of birth missing (living people)
Women state legislators in Kansas
21st-century American politicians
21st-century American women politicians
People from Johnson County, Kansas
Educators from Kansas
American women educators